Consorts of the Kings of Greece were women married to the rulers of the Kingdom of Greece during their reign. All monarchs of modern Greece were male.

Greek consorts bore the title, Queen of the Hellenes and the style, Majesty. The following queens were spouses of the kings of modern Greece between 1836 and 1973:

Queen consort of Greece

House of Wittelsbach (1832–1862)

Queens consort of the Hellenes

House of Glücksburg (1863–1973)

Titular Queens consort of Greece

House of Wittelsbach (since 1862)

Titular Queens consort of the Hellenes

House of Glücksburg (1924–1935)

House of Glücksburg (since 1973)

See also
 List of kings of Greece
 List of heads of state of Greece
 List of Roman and Byzantine empresses
 List of exiled and pretending Byzantine Empresses

Notes

 
Greece, Queens Consort of
Roy
Greek